JPB may refer to:

 Jan Peter Balkenende (born 1956), Dutch politician
 John Perry Barlow (1947–2018), American poet and politician
 Jonathan P. Bowen (born 1956), British computer scientist
 Star Wars Episode I: Jedi Power Battles, a video game
 Peninsula Corridor Joint Powers Board, a railway agency in California